The 2012 South Florida Bulls football team represented the University of South Florida (USF) in the 2012 NCAA Division I FBS football season.  The Bulls played their home games at Raymond James Stadium in Tampa, Florida. The 2012 season was the 16th season overall for the Bulls and their 8th season as a member of the Big East Conference. This was Holtz's third and final year at USF; USF fired Holtz at the conclusion of the season. They finished the season 3–9, 1–6 in Big East play to finish in last place. This season saw the Bulls win their fewest games in program history (3).

Schedule

References

South Florida
South Florida Bulls football seasons
South Florida Bulls football